Wolfgang Eisenmenger (11 February 1930 – 10 December 2016) was a German physicist.

Fields of investigation
His PhD thesis (1958) dealt with the surface tension of water and aqueous solutions.

In 1964 he defended his habilitation thesis concerning experimental investigations regarding shock waves in liquids in the acoustical frequency domain. He developed from these investigations an electromagnetic shock wave generator for lithotripsy of kidney stones.

Awards and distinctions
 corresponding member of Akademie der Wissenschaften zu Göttingen, since 1988
 Robert-Wichard-Pohl Award of Deutsche Physikalische Gesellschaft, 1995
 Honorary doctorate from University of Oldenburg, 2002
 Helmholtz Medal of Deutsche Gesellschaft für Akustik, 2003

Notes

References
 M. Pilkuhn, M. Wagner: Zur Emeritierung von Prof. Eisenmenger: Grundlagenforschung und Praxisnähe. In: Stuttgarter unikurier Nr.79, 1998

External links
 
 Uni-Infos vom 04.08.2003 – 08.08.2003. Helmholtz-Medaille für Experimentalphysiker. Universität Stuttgart

1930 births
2016 deaths
20th-century German physicists
People from Gelsenkirchen